Hedda Hynne (born 13 March 1990) is a Norwegian middle-distance runner competing primarily in the 800 metres. She competed at the 2016 IAAF World Indoor Championships. Her personal bests in the event are 1:58:10 outdoors (Bellinzona 2020) and 2:01.55 indoors (Reykjavik 2017). Both are current national records.

Competition record

References

External links
 
 
 
 
 
 

1990 births
Living people
Norwegian female middle-distance runners
Sportspeople from Skien
Olympic athletes of Norway
Athletes (track and field) at the 2016 Summer Olympics
Norwegian Athletics Championships winners
World Athletics Championships athletes for Norway
Athletes (track and field) at the 2020 Summer Olympics
20th-century Norwegian women
21st-century Norwegian women